Katarysh (Qatarış) is a rural locality (a village) in Uzyansky Selsoviet, Beloretsky District, Bashkortostan, Russia. The population was 14 as of 2010. There is 1 street.

Geography 
Katarysh is located 65 km southwest of Beloretsk (the district's administrative centre) by road. Uzyan is the nearest rural locality.

References 

Rural localities in Beloretsky District